Yu Lizhi (born 5 January 1969) is a Chinese badminton player. He competed in the men's singles tournament at the 1996 Summer Olympics.

References

External links
 

1969 births
Living people
Chinese male badminton players
Olympic badminton players of China
Badminton players at the 1996 Summer Olympics
Place of birth missing (living people)